George "Doc" MacKenzie (1906 in Eddington, Pennsylvania –  23 August 1936 in Milwaukee, Wisconsin) was an American racecar driver. After being involved in and surviving a five-car crash during the 1936 Indianapolis 500, he was killed in a sprint car crash in the same year.

Career award
He was inducted in the National Sprint Car Hall of Fame in 1994.
1935 Hankinson Circuit and AAA Eastern Champ.  First ever to hold both titles.

Indy 500 results

References

1906 births
1936 deaths
AAA Championship Car drivers
Indianapolis 500 drivers
National Sprint Car Hall of Fame inductees
People from Bensalem Township, Pennsylvania
Racing drivers from Pennsylvania
Racing drivers who died while racing
Sports deaths in Wisconsin